The 1998 Georgia gubernatorial election was held on November 3, 1998. Incumbent Democratic Governor Zell Miller was unable to seek re-election due to term limits, therefore creating an open seat. To replace him, State Representative Roy Barnes won the Democratic Party's nomination after a close and highly contested primary election, while businessman Guy Millner, who had run for Governor and the United States Senate in the previous four years, won the nomination of the Republican Party.

In the general election, Barnes was able to defeat Millner by a margin of victory larger than Governor Miller's victory over Millner four years prior, which was in part due to the unpopularity and controversy of Mitch Skandalakis, the Republican nominee for Lieutenant Governor of Georgia. , this is the last time a Democrat was elected Governor of Georgia.

Democratic primary

Candidates
 Roy Barnes, State Representative from Marietta
 Lewis A. Massey, Georgia Secretary of State
 David Poythress, Georgia Commissioner of Labor
 Steve Langford, Georgia State Senator from LaGrange
 Morris James
 Carlton Myers, Pine Mountain veterinarian and candidate for Senate in 1974

Results

Runoff results

Republican primary

Candidates
 Guy Millner, 1996 Republican nominee for the United States Senate, 1994 Republican nominee for Governor of Georgia, businessman
 Mike Bowers, Attorney General of Georgia
 Nancy Schaefer, 1994 Republican nominee for Lieutenant Governor of Georgia
 Bruce Hatfield

Results

General election

Results

References

1998
Gubernatorial
1998 United States gubernatorial elections